Sergey Lavrenov (born January 28, 1981, in Moscow) is a retired Russian swimmer, who specialized in middle-distance freestyle events. Lavrenov competed for the Russian squad in the men's 4 × 200 m freestyle relay at the 2000 Summer Olympics in Sydney. Teaming with Dmitry Chernyshov, Andrey Kapralov, and long-distance freestyle star Alexei Filipets, Lavrenov swam the second leg and recorded a split of 1:51.65. The Russians rounded out the finale in eighth place with a final time of 7:24.37, finishing more than 17 seconds off the global standard set by the winning Aussies.

References

1981 births
Living people
Russian male swimmers
Olympic swimmers of Russia
Swimmers at the 2000 Summer Olympics
Russian male freestyle swimmers
Swimmers from Moscow